Finsterwald, meaning 'dark forest' in the  German language, is a surname. Notable people with the surname include:
Dow Finsterwald (1929–2022), American professional golfer
Maxine Finsterwald (1906–1993), American dramatist and playwright
Russ Finsterwald (1896–1962), American football and basketball player and coach

See also
Finsterwalder (disambiguation)

German toponymic surnames
Surnames of Swiss origin